The 1500 metres speed skating event was part of the speed skating at the 1960 Winter Olympics programme. The competition was held on the Squaw Valley Olympic Skating Rink and for the first time at the Olympics on artificially frozen ice. It was held on Friday, February 26, 1960. Forty-eight speed skaters from 16 nations competed.

Medalists

Records
These were the standing world and Olympic records (in minutes) prior to the 1960 Winter Olympics.

(*) The record was set in a high altitude venue (more than 1000 metres above sea level) and on artificially frozen ice.

(**) The record was set in a high altitude venue (more than 1000 metres above sea level) and on naturally frozen ice.

Results

Yevgeny Grishin who was the first speed skater to defend his 500 metres Olympic title was also able to repeat his win in the 1500 metres event. In 1956 he shared the win with fellow countryman Yuri Mikhaylov. This time Grishin tied with Roald Aas. Grishin was the second speed skater to win two gold medals in 1500 metres competitions after Clas Thunberg won in 1924 and 1928.

References

External links
Official Olympic Report
 

Men's speed skating at the 1960 Winter Olympics